{{Infobox Italian comune
| name                = Montemurro
| official_name       = Comune di Montemurro
| native_name         = 
| image_skyline       = Montemurro1.jpg 
| imagesize           = 
| image_alt           = 
| image_caption       = 
| image_shield        = Montemurro-Stemma.svg
| shield_alt          = 
| image_map           = 
| map_alt             = 
| map_caption         = 
| pushpin_label_position = 
| pushpin_map_alt     = 
| coordinates         = 
| coordinates_footnotes = 
| region              = 
| province            =  (PZ)
| frazioni            = Le Piane
| mayor_party         = 
| mayor               = 
| area_footnotes      = 
| area_total_km2      = 56.54
| population_footnotes = 
| population_total    = 1428
| population_as_of    = 30 March 2008
| pop_density_footnotes = 
| population_demonym  = Montemurresi (Local dialect: munt'murris)
| elevation_footnotes = 
| elevation_min_m     =
| elevation_max_m     =
| elevation_m         = 723
| twin1               = 
| twin1_country       = 
| saint               = St. George and St. Maurice
| day                 = 23 April (St. George) and 16–18 August (St. Roch) 
| postal_code         = 85053
| area_code           = 0971
| website             = 
| footnotes           =

| istat               = 076052
| fractions           = Armento, Corleto Perticara, Grumento Nova, San Martino d'Agri, Spinoso, Viggiano
| fiscal_code         = F573
}}Montemurro''' is a town and comune'' in the province of Potenza, in the Southern Italian region of Basilicata.

References

Cities and towns in Basilicata